Charles Southward Singleton (1909–1985) was an American scholar, writer, and critic of literature. He was an expert on the work of Dante Alighieri and Giovanni Boccaccio. He wrote An Essay on the Vita Nuova (1949) and Dante Studies (I vol. in 1954). He studied, as did the German critic Erich Auerbach, the allegorical interpretation of Dante's Divine Comedy, a work which he also translated into English in six volumes. Irma Brandeis was one of his disciples.

Singleton earned his associated bachelor's from the University of Missouri in 1931 and went on to receive his doctorate from the University of California at Berkeley in 1936. From 1937 until his death, he taught at Johns Hopkins University, except from 1948 to 1957, when he filled the chair in Italian studies at Harvard.

In 1950, Singleton was elected to the American Academy of Arts and Sciences. He was elected to the American Philosophical Society in 1962. He gave the lecture: "The Vistas in Retrospect" in 1965 at the Congresso Internazionale di Studi Danteschi in Florence where he received the golden medal for Dante Studies whose other honorees include T. S. Eliot and André Pezard.

References

External links
Singleton's death in The New York Times and the Associated Press

1909 births
1985 deaths
American literary critics
20th-century American essayists
Italian–English translators
Translators of Dante Alighieri
Dante scholars
Fellows of the Medieval Academy of America
20th-century translators

Members of the American Philosophical Society